Barang Junction railway station is a railway station on the East Coast Railway network in the state of Odisha, India. It serves Barang town. Its code is BRAG. It has four platforms. Passenger, MEMU, Express trains halt at Barang Junction railway station.

Major trains

 East Coast Express
 Sri Jagannath Express

See also
 Cuttack district

References

Railway stations in Cuttack district
Khurda Road railway division